With Friends Like These is a 1979 studio album of improvised experimental music by Fred Frith and Henry Kaiser. It was recorded in July 1979, and was released on LP by Metalanguage Records later that year. It was Frith and Kaiser's first collaborative album, and was followed in 1983 by Who Needs Enemies?

In 1987 SST Records released With Enemies Like These, Who Needs Friends?, a CD with five tracks from With Friends Like These, seven tracks from Who Needs Enemies?, and four additional tracks from an unreleased live album by Frith and Kaiser. In 1999 Cuneiform Records released Friends & Enemies, a double-CD containing all the tracks from With Friends Like These and Who Needs Enemies?, plus unreleased live and studio material.

Background
Frith and Kaiser began working together when English avant-rock group Henry Cow, with whom Frith played guitar, lost their bass player. Frith decided to switch to bass guitar and recruited Kaiser to play guitar for the band. While Kaiser never joined the band permanently, he played guitar at several of their European concerts. Frith and Kaiser's work together resulted in a partnership that gave rise to two collaborative albums, With Friends Like These and Who Needs Enemies?, and several concert performances.

Reception

In a review in AllMusic, Dean McFarlane called With Friends Like These "[a]n extraordinary collaboration between two of avant-garde's most respected guitarists". He described much of the album as "chaotic experimental noise", but added that "traditional virtuosity" also features prominently. McFarlane concluded that With Friends Like These showcases some of Frith and Kaiser's "most striking performances", and demands repeated listening, which, he said, is unusual for this type of music.

Also writing in AllMusic, Rick Anderson described With Friends Like These as "one of the defining documents of the downtown avant-garde scene". He said Frith and Kaiser's improvised duets "essentially redefined the sound of the guitar".

Track listing
All music by Fred Frith and Henry Kaiser.

Tracks 2, 6 and 7 are guitar duets recorded with no overdubbing.

Sources: Liner notes, Discogs, Fred Frith discography.

Personnel
Fred Frith – electric guitars, etc
Henry Kaiser – electric guitars, etc

Sources: Liner notes, Discogs, Fred Frith discography.

Sound
Recorded and mixed by Oliver DiCicco at Mobius Music, San Francisco
Produced by Fred Frith and Henry Kaiser
Mastered by Phil Brown at Warner Brothers Studio, Hollywood

Sources: Liner notes, Discogs, Fred Frith discography.

References

1979 debut albums
Collaborative albums
Experimental music albums
Free improvisation albums
Fred Frith albums
Henry Kaiser (musician) albums
Metalanguage Records albums